The Detroit River Group is a geologic group in Michigan and Ohio. It preserves fossils dating back to the Devonian period.

References

Further reading
 Brian R. Pratt, Lower Devonian Stromatoporoid reefs. Formosa Reef Limestone (Detroit River Group) of Southwestern Ontario. In: Reefs, Canada and Adjacent Area, ed. by  H.H.J. Geldsetzer, N.P. James and G.E. Tebbutt, Editors Canadian Society of Petroieum Geologists Memoir 13, 1989, p. 506-509
 Gilbert Klapper and, William A. Oliver, Jr., The Detroit River Group is Middle Devonian: Discussion on "Early Devonian age of the Detroit River Group, inferred from Arctic stromatoporoids". (Canadian Journal of Earth Sciences, 1995, 32(7): 1070–1073, https://doi.org/10.1139/e95-088

Geologic groups of Michigan